"Parpodi," also known as "Raja Parpodi," is a town and a Nagar Panchayat in the Bemetara district of Chhattisgarh, India.
The town is situated in the district of Bemetara in the state of Chhattisgarh, India. It has a small population and has been declared a "Nagar Panchayat" of the Bemetara district.

Situated along the Durg-Kabirdham road, the town is easily accessible by road from the city of Bemetara /Durg/Raipur, which was the ancient citadel of the Gondwana dynasty, is known for being a historical, religious, and cultural venue. According to popular legend, the name of the town was given after the name of the last Zamindar aunt "Parmeshwari Devi." 
Most of Parpodi is rigid ground.

On 28 May 2013 Parpodi became a Nagar Panchayat with district headquarters at Bemetara itself but formally this town is under of Durg District,  it is now in the Bemetara district. The town is under Saja assembly, and Mr. ravindra choubey is the current MLA of the area. Since 1 January 2012 Parpodi has been under the administration of the Bemetara district of Chhattisgarh.

Geography

Latitude: 21.583333 / 21° 34' 59.9982"

Longitude: 81.216667 / 81° 13' 0.0012"

Province: Chhattisgarh

Country: India (Bharat)

Continent: Asia

Demographics
In 2011, India census Parpodi had a population of approximately 6000. Males constitute 51% of the population and females make up 49%. Parpodi has an average literacy rate of 62%; this is higher than the national average of 59.5%: male literacy is 72% and female literacy is 51%. 15% of the population are children under 6 years.

Climate
Parpodi has a tropical wet and dry climate. Temperatures remain moderate  from July through February, with extremely hot temperatures from March to June. The temperature in April and May sometimes rises above . These summer months also have hot, dry winds.

Economy
The economy of Parpodi is based on agriculture. Almost 70% of the people in town work on farms. This place has great development as it has two banks, Grameen Bank and cooperative bank. The president of cooperative bank is Vijay Dubey, who was elected with a huge number of votes on his side, he is active in regional politics also, and very close to MLA, Ravindra Choubey Ji.

Culture
The culture of this town is influenced by the Chhattisgarhi ethics, rituals and customs. Like other Chhattisgarhi regions, this region also organises mandai, mela at different occasions. Matar is also conducted on behalf of the bhaiduj celebration which is organised on the day after diwali, while mandai and mela are celebrated during February and March. Some Muslim communities also celebrate eid.

Ethnic groups
Most of the people come under the Indian (aryans) ethnicity or under the deccan indo-dravidian ethnicity. Parpodi town is situated just centre of the chhattishgarh and is an active participant in trade - that is why most of the people in this region are vaishya (traders) and natives are tribal.

Food
Parpodi is famous for Doobraj rice, chila, rice role, angakar roti, thetri-khurmi etc.
No trip to this town is complete without trying samosa, poha, and jalebi, from various vendors.
The large but light samosa of Parpodi is different from the Punjabi kind (which is bulkier and full of spicy masala). This pale gold, dimpled pastry is very popular with travelers.
There are many other local Chhattisgarhi foods that you can sample while visiting a local family, such as cheela with chatni.

Transport
The three nearest railway stations, Durg, Raipur, and Rajnandgaon, are 55, 68 and 65 kilometres respectively from Parpodi.  Direct trains for Vishakhapatnam, Mumbai, Pune, Ahmedabad, Howrah, Bhubaneswar, Chennai, Trivandrum, Amritsar and New Delhi are available from these railway stations, situated on the main train route of Howrah-Mumbai via Nagpur.  The state capital Raipur is an hour's journey from Parpodi.  Raipur and Nagpur airports are at a distance of 75 and 280 kilometres, respectively.

Attractions around Parpodi

Kanha National Park - MUKKI GATE is just 115 km away from Parpodi.
Achanakmar Wildlife Sanctuary is 170 km away from Parpodi.
Amarkantak is just 205 km away from Parpodi.
Bhoramdeo Temple is just 75 km away from Parpodi
Dongargarh is just 90 km away from Parpodi.
Shri Uwassaggaharam Parshwa Tirth Nagpura, just 55 km away from Parpodi.
Iskcon Temple Kumhari, Raipur just 53 km away from Parpodi.

School and colleges
 A boys primary school 
 A girls primary school
 Rajiv Gandhi: a Higher Secondary School
 Sarojini Naidu: Girls Higher Secondary School.
 Govt. Industrial Training Institute Trades run in ITI is Electrician, Fitter, sewing Technology,Copa all trades are NCVT affiliated.

References

 Industrial Training Institute (ITI) Parpodi Chhattisgarh
 Centre clears Rs 222 cr for city bus project

Cities and towns in Durg district